Rowan Petrus Christiaan Gouws (born ) is a South African rugby union player who currently plays for Rugby ATL of Major League Rugby (MLR) in the United States. His regular position is scrum-half.

Rugby career

Schoolboy rugby

Gouws was born in Richards Bay, but grew up in Mpumalanga, where he attended Hoër Tegniese Skool Middelburg.

Sharks

After school, he moved to Durban to join the  academy. He played for their Under-19 team in the 2014 Under-19 Provincial Championship and for their Under-21 team in the Under-21 Provincial Championships in 2015 and 2016.

He made a further five starts and two appearances as a replacement for the Sharks XV in the 2017 Rugby Challenge competition.

Eastern Province Kings / Southern Kings

In the second half of 2017, Gouws moved to Port Elizabeth to continue his rugby career.

Gouws also played for the  – the new name for the Eastern Province Kings – in the 2018 Rugby Challenge.

References

South African rugby union players
Living people
1995 births
People from uMhlathuze Local Municipality
Rugby union scrum-halves
Eastern Province Elephants players
Southern Kings players
Sharks (Currie Cup) players
Otago rugby union players
Rugby ATL players
Rugby union players from Mpumalanga